Pompeo Vizzani (24 June 1540 - 8 August 1607) was an Italian historian, narrating chronicles of his native Bologna.

Born to a non-senatorial family of Bologna, his brothers were Camillo (1542-1566) and Giasone (1538-1618) Vizzani. His initial history of Bologna (ending in 1530) in ten volumes was published in 1602. Two further volumes were published in 1608 about the history until 1599.

References

External links 
 

1540 births
1607 deaths
16th-century Italian historians
16th-century Italian writers
People from Bologna